Destrehan is a census-designated place (CDP) in St. Charles Parish, Louisiana, United States. At the 2020 census, its population was 11,340.

Etymology 
The community is named after Jean Noël Destréhan (1754–1823), who was twice President of the Orleans Territory's legislative council during his service there in 1806 and 1811. He was elected to the United States Senate when Louisiana became a state in 1812, but he resigned after a month. He served in the Louisiana State Senate from 1812 to 1817.

Destrehan Plantation, his former home, is listed on the National Register of Historic Places. The main house has been restored and is one of the attractions on the Great River Road along the Mississippi River.

History

George Prince tragedy 

Before the Hale Boggs Memorial Bridge was completed connecting the communities of Destrehan and Luling, automobile ferries connected the towns. On October 20, 1976, one of these ferries, the George Prince, was struck by a tanker and capsized as it crossed the Mississippi River resulting in the MV George Prince ferry disaster. Seventy-eight passengers and crew died.

Gary Tyler case 
Destrehan was briefly notorious in 1974 for the case of Gary Tyler, a 17 year old black student who was accused by local officials of the murder of 13 year old white student and the wounding of another, on a day of violent  protests by white students at Destrehan High School. Many observers believe his conviction and trial were unfair and flawed. He was convicted and sentenced to prison. He was released from prison in 2016.

Geography
Destrehan is located at  (29.962307, -90.369160).

Demographics 

As of the 2020 United States census, there were 11,340 people, 4,257 households, and 3,334 families residing in the CDP.

Education

St. Charles Parish Public School System operates public schools:
Destrehan High School (9–12)
Harry M. Hurst Middle School (Formerly 7–8 & presently 6–8)
Ethel Schoeffner Elementary School (Formerly 4–6 & presently 3–5)
New Sarpy Elementary School (Formerly PK–3 & presently PK–2)

In popular culture
Destrehan Plantation was used as a set in the film 12 Years a Slave (2013).

Notable people

Paul Boudreau, assistant coach of the New Orleans Saints
Paul F. Boudreau, NFL and CFL assistant coach
Joel T. Chaisson, II, District Attorney and Louisiana State Senate President 
Jean Noël Destréhan, U.S. Senator 
Jesse Duplantis, televangelist
Hoffman Franklin Fuller, professor-emeritus at Tulane University Law School and Bossier City mayor
Shelley Hennig, actress and Miss Teen USA 2004
Dalton Hilliard, NFL running back for the New Orleans Saints
Joe Horn, NFL wide receiver for the Kansas City Chiefs, New Orleans Saints and Atlanta Falcons
Justin Jefferson, wide receiver for Louisiana State University and Minnesota Vikings
Harry J. Kember Jr., member of the Louisiana House of Representatives
Tanner Lee, NFL quarterback for the Jacksonville Jaguars
Glen Logan, NFL defensive tackle for the Cleveland Browns
Kirk Merritt, NFL wide receiver for the Miami Dolphins and New Orleans Saints
Gregory A. Miller, member of the Louisiana House of Representatives
Jim E. Mora, head coach of the New Orleans Saints
Bum Phillips, head coach of the New Orleans Saints
Ed Reed, NFL safety for the Baltimore Ravens
Mike Scifres, NFL punter for the San Diego Chargers
Hubert Shurtz, NFL tackle with the Philadelphia Eagles
Byron O. Thomas, known by stage name Mannie Fresh, rapper and producer
Devon Walker, safety for Tulane University and New Orleans Saints

See also
St. Charles Borromeo Church (Destrehan, Louisiana)
Ormond Plantation House

References

Census-designated places in Louisiana
Census-designated places in St. Charles Parish, Louisiana
Census-designated places in New Orleans metropolitan area
Louisiana populated places on the Mississippi River